In philately, the vignette is the central part of a postage stamp design, such as, a monarch's head or a pictorial design, which often shades off gradually to the edges of the stamp.

The central vignette is often surrounded by a frame which may be printed separately and is normally of a different colour. The plate from which the vignette is printed is known as the vignette plate.

Printing errors have sometimes led to the vignette being inverted. Perhaps the most famous example is the Inverted Jenny.

Alternative meaning 
A different use of the term vignette in philately is to describe publicity labels or poster stamps which do not have postal validity, such as those produced in France during World War One by Delandre.

See also
Vignetting

References 

Philatelic terminology